Colin Wells may refer to:

Colin Wells (actor) (born 1963), English actor in Titus
Colin Wells (cricketer) (born 1960), English cricketer
Colin Wells (historian) (1933–2010), English classicist
Colin Wells (Spooks), fictional character in the BBC series Spooks
Colin Wells (diplomat), ambassador of the United Kingdom to Mauritania since 2021